Greg M. Epstein (born 1977) is the president of the Harvard Chaplains Organization and Humanist Chaplain at Harvard University and the Massachusetts Institute of Technology. He is an ordained Humanist Rabbi, and has been influential in American humanism as a blogger, spokesperson, adviser and author of the New York Times bestseller Good Without God: What a Billion Nonreligious People Do Believe. Epstein was an expert on the first three seasons of the reality show "Married at First Sight."

Early life and education
Epstein grew up in Flushing, Queens, New York as an assimilated and disinterested Reform Jew. He studied Buddhism and Taoism while at Stuyvesant High School in New York City and in college went to Taiwan for a semester aiming to study Ch'an (Zen) Buddhism in its original language and context. Finding that Eastern religions do not necessarily have greater access to truth than Western ones, he returned to the US and shifted his focus to rock music, recording and singing professionally for a year after college. Soon thereafter, he learned of the movement of Humanism and the possibility of a career as a Humanist rabbi and chaplain.

Humanism at Harvard
In 2005, Epstein received ordination as a Humanist Rabbi from the International Institute for Secular Humanistic Judaism, where he studied in Jerusalem and Michigan for five years. He holds a BA (Religion and Chinese) and an MA (Judaic Studies) from the University of Michigan, Ann Arbor, and a Masters of Theological Studies from the Harvard Divinity School.

Epstein began serving as Humanist Chaplain at Harvard in fall 2005, when the Humanist Chaplaincy at Harvard's total annual budget was $28,000. In the years since then, he has raised nearly $3 million in gifts and pledges to the organization, while organizing and launching a range of new programs and initiatives, including opening the Humanist Hub, a  "Center for Humanist Life" in Harvard Square, where members are encouraged to "connect with other people, act to make the world better, and evolve as human beings."

While at Harvard, Epstein has blogged for CNN, Newsweek and The Washington Post; and his work as a Humanist rabbi and chaplain has been featured by ABC World News with Diane Sawyer. ABC News Network, Al Jazeera and others. He is an adviser to two student groups at Harvard College, the Secular Society and the Interfaith Council, and to the Harvard Humanist Graduate Community. From 2007 to 2010, he chaired the Advisory Board of the national umbrella organization the Secular Student Alliance, joining such renowned nonbelievers as Richard Dawkins and Christopher Hitchens. In 2011 he lectured at the inaugural event of the group Agnostics, Atheists, Humanists, & Secularists in Santa Monica, California.

In an interview, Epstein says that being a Humanist Rabbi "means I combine Jewish culture with the belief that this world is all we have". He is not anti-religious and "he is happy to work with the religious left (as he calls it) to help beat off the fundamentalist religious right." The Guardian compares his influence in American humanism to Richard Dawkins influence in the UK.

In August 2021 Epstein was elected by the members of the Harvard Chaplains Organization as the organization's president.

Humanist Community Project
Epstein led the Boston-based Humanist Community Project, later renamed to Humanist Hub, together with assistant humanist chaplain Vanessa Zoltan. The project boasted several hundred student members and its mission included developing "opportunities for connection, ethical development, and the celebration of life based on human reason, compassion, and creativity, not religious dogma."

Ethics of technology at MIT
In 2018 Epstein began serving as humanist chaplain at MIT concurrently with his Harvard post. His role at MIT focuses in large part on the ethics of technology. His duties include encouraging non-religious students to give deep consideration to the societal impact of the entrepreneurial ventures they may go on to launch.

Personal life
In early 2021 Epstein shared his struggles with compulsive smartphone use and addiction to networked technologies.

References

External links
Mr. Greg Epstein, Humanist Chaplaincy Harvard University's Chaplains at Harvard profile page for Greg Epstein.
Good without God: ABC World News profile on Greg Epstein, broadcast on January 24, 2010.
Bio at Huffington Post
 

American Humanistic Jews
Humanistic rabbis
Jewish humanists
American humanists
Jewish American atheists
Harvard Divinity School alumni
University and college chaplains in America
University of Michigan alumni
Living people
1977 births
People from Flushing, Queens
American skeptics
Secular humanists
Harvard University staff
Stuyvesant High School alumni
Writers about religion and science